Bergaris lutescens is a species of moth of the family Cossidae. It is found in Malaysia, Myanmar and on Borneo. The habitat consists of lowland forests, including dry heath forests.

The ground colour of the fore- and hindwings is dull orange. On the hindwings, the spaces between the veins are uniform grey.

Subspecies
Bergaris lutescens lutescens
Bergaris lutescens griseola (Roepke, 1957) Malaysia

References

Moths described in 1957
Zeuzerinae